Bottomless Lake may refer to:

 Bottomless Lakes State Park in New Mexico, U.S., its oldest state park
 Bottomless Lake (Oregon), a dry lake in central Oregon, U.S., once part of Summer Lake (Oregon)
 Lake Manitoba, a lake in Manitoba, Canada

Other 
 Grundloser See in Germany; grundloser see is German for bottomless lake
 Lacul Fără Fund in Romania; lacul fără fund is Romanian for the bottomless lake